The term King of Niue may refer to:
 Patu-iki 
 List of Niuean monarchs